Thursley is a village and civil parish in southwest Surrey, west of the A3 between Milford and Hindhead. An associated hamlet is Bowlhead Green. To the east is Brook. In the south of the parish rises the Greensand Ridge, in this section reaching its escarpment near Punch Bowl Farm and the Devil's Punch Bowl, Hindhead.

History

The village's name came from Old English Þunres lēah meaning lea of the god Thunor, as with Thundersley, Essex; it was probably a site where he was worshipped. There is a rocky outcrop near the village referred to in Victorian guides to the area as Thor's Stone. This stone is first mentioned in Saxon times as being "near Peper Harow", an adjacent parish with known pagan connections. The precise stone or rocks this refers to is now uncertain, with some sources indicating it could be the rocky outcrop and others suggesting it may be an ancient Celtic boundary stone found on the margin of Pudmore pond on Ockley Common.

The small parish church, dedicated to St Michael and All Angels, has a finely carved Anglo-Saxon font and two surviving Anglo-Saxon windows in the chancel, which exceptionally retain their original wooden frames. Its small wooden shingled belfry is strangely underpinned by an unnecessarily large and sturdy late medieval framework of heavy timber. The remains of a gnarled ancient tree are nearby. In the churchyard there is the gravestone of the Unknown Sailor.

There have been several military camps in the parish. Between 1922 and 1957 there existed Thursley Camp (from 1941 renamed Tweedsmuir Camp) to the north west of the village which housed British, Canadian and American forces at various times. On 7 November 1942 it was bombed by the Luftwaffe. After the Second World War it was used to house displaced Poles. To the west was Houndown Camp which was used by the British Royal Marines.

Geography

The north of the parish is mostly Thursley Nature Reserve, a sandy and seasonally marshy Site of Special Scientific Interest, the lowest part of a larger area of uncultivated open land made up of the remainder of Thursley Common and of Witley Common.  Across the A3 is the main hillside neighbourhood of Thursley, Bowlhead Green, which has an underpass path crossing directly between the two on the Greensand Way.  The two are also connected via one of the largest junctions of the A3 road in the north of the parish, in terms of its multiple slip roads, which facilitate access for the Ministry of Transport to the restricted land to the far north, Hankley Common.

Wildlife

Thursley Common is a national nature reserve and SSSI. It is one of the last surviving areas of lowland peat bog in southern Britain, and at 350 hectares, one of the largest remaining fragments of heathland. It provides a particularly rich habitat for dragonflies and damselflies, along with many other species including the endangered woodlark and Dartford warbler. In July 2006 during a heat wave that affected southern England, 60% of the common was burnt. In May 2020 there was another common fire affecting 150 hectares.

Notable residents
James Anderson, actor
Mary Bennett, principal of St Hilda's College, Oxford
Monica Edwards wrote the Punch Bowl Farm series at the eponymous farm from 1947 to 1970. Thereafter she and her husband lived in a retirement bungalow built in one of its fields.
H. A. L. Fisher was an English historian, educator, and Liberal politician. He served as president of the Board of Education in David Lloyd George's 1916 to 1922 coalition government. He was also warden of New College, Oxford, from 1925 to 1940.
Lettice Fisher founded the National Council for the Unmarried Mother and her Child, now known as Gingerbread. Both Lettice Fisher and Mary Bennett died at Rock Cottage in Thursley.
Sir Edwin Lutyens, architect, grew up in the village where some of his earliest work is to be found.  While making use of modern concrete for large spaces, exemplified by his bridges, his churches and homes incorporated methods of traditional timber framing, long tile or slate roofs, distinctive eaves or in appropriately grand settings Bargate or Bath stone.  The inspiration was walking in the surrounding area that he developed his love and appreciation of vernacular (authentic Arts and Crafts) buildings, in particular their woodwork, fenestration, tiling and materials.
Sir Roger Stevens, diplomat and Vice-Chancellor of the University of Leeds
Roger Taylor (Queen drummer) lived at Millhanger from 1979 to 2003.
Margaret Louisa Woods, writer

Demography and housing

The average level of accommodation in the region composed of detached houses was 28 per cent, the average that was apartments was 22.6 per cent.

The proportion of households in the civil parish who owned their home outright compares to the regional average of 35.1 per cent.  The proportion who owned their home with a loan compares to the regional average of 32.5 per cent.  The remaining percentage is made up of rented dwellings (plus a negligible percentage of households living rent-free).

References

External links

 Thursley Parish 2008: Village Design Statement
 Wey River: Thursley National Nature Reserve
 St. Michael & All Angels, Thursley: Parish Profile 22 March 2010
 Stained Glass Windows at St. Michael & All Angels, Thursley, Surrey

Villages in Surrey
Borough of Waverley
Anglo-Saxon paganism
Place names
Civil parishes in Surrey